"Do You Call My Name" is a song by American alternative metal band Ra. The song was released as the first single from the band's debut album From One. A live and acoustic version of the song was released as a standalone single in 2012.

Background and overview
An earlier version of "Do You Call My Name" appeared on the band's debut EP One, released in 2000. The song has been featured and used in various other media and is one of the band's most popular songs.

The song's intro features influences from Middle Eastern music.

Music video
A music video was created for the song and was directed by Clay Patrick McBride. The video shows the band performing the song, primarily focusing on Sahaj.

Track listing

Chart positions

Personnel
Sahaj Ticotin – lead vocals, guitar
Ben Carroll – guitar
Sean Corcoran – bass, backing vocals
Skoota Warner – drums

References

Ra (American band) songs
2002 songs
2003 debut singles
Republic Records singles
Universal Music Group singles
Songs written by Sahaj (musician)